Haroon Akhtar Khan is a Pakistani politician who was a Member of the Senate of Pakistan, from March to October 2018.

Political career
In January 2018, Prime Minister Shahid Khaqan Abbasi appointed Khan as his special assistant on revenue and granted him the status of a federal minister.

He was nominated by Pakistan Muslim League (N) (PML-N) as its candidate in 2018 Pakistani Senate election. However the Election Commission of Pakistan declared all PML-N candidates for the Senate election as independent after a ruling of the Supreme Court of Pakistan.

Khan was elected to the Senate of Pakistan as an independent candidate on general seat from Punjab in Senate election. He was backed in the election by PML-N and joined the treasury benches, led by PML-N after getting elected. He took oath as Senator on 12 March 2018.

Corruption Charges
In one of The New York Times investigations, General Akhtar Abdur Rahman Khan, as the head of Pakistani intelligence agency, helped funnel billions of dollars in cash and other aid from the United States and other countries to the Mujahedeen in Afghanistan to support their fight against the Soviet Union. The same report mentioned that a Credit Suisse account was opened in 1985, in the name of three General Khan's sons. Years later, the account would grow to hold $3.7 million, the leaked records show. According to the paper, "Two of the general's sons, Akbar and Haroon Khan, did not respond to requests for comment from the reporting project. In a text message, a third son, Ghazi Khan, called information about the accounts "not correct," adding, "The content is conjectural." The claims remain unproven......

References

Living people
Pakistan Muslim League (N) politicians
Members of the Senate of Pakistan
Pakistani emigrants to Canada
Naturalized citizens of Canada
Year of birth missing (living people)
People who lost Canadian citizenship